Norman Ickeringill (22 January 1923 – 18 August 2007) was an Australian wrestler. He competed in the men's Greco-Roman featherweight at the 1956 Summer Olympics.

References

1923 births
2007 deaths
Australian male sport wrestlers
Olympic wrestlers of Australia
Wrestlers at the 1956 Summer Olympics
Sportspeople from Melbourne